Bellenden Ker is a rural town and locality in the Cairns Region, Queensland, Australia.

History

Bellenden Ker State School opened on 14 August 1922.

Bellenden Ker Post Office opened on 1 July 1936 and closed on 23 November 1974.

Education 
Bellenden Ker State School is a government primary (Prep-6) school for boys and girls at Harvey Creek Road. In 2018, the school had an enrolment of 10 students with 2 teachers (1 full-time equivalent) and 4 non-teaching staff (1 full-time equivalent).

There are no secondary schools in Bellenden Ker. The nearest government secondary school is Babina State School in neighbouring Babinda to the south.

Amenities 

There is a boat ramp with jetty on the Russell River Road on the north bank of the Russell River. It is managed by the Cairns Regional Council.

References

Further reading

External links 

 

Towns in Queensland
Suburbs of Cairns
Localities in Queensland